Gavij (also Romanized as Gavīj, Gevīj, and Govīj; also known as Chivi, Kevīj, Kivi, Kīvīch, Kīvīj, and Kovij) is a village in Mavazekhan-e Shomali Rural District of Khvajeh District, Heris County, East Azerbaijan province, Iran. At the 2006 National Census, its population was 768 in 167 households. The following census in 2011 counted 637 people in 172 households. The latest census in 2016 showed a population of 551 people in 176 households; it was the largest village in its rural district.

References 

Heris County

Populated places in East Azerbaijan Province

Populated places in Heris County